Keydell House  was situated in  of land near Lovedean Corner, in the village of Horndean, part of the ecclesiastical parish of Catherington Hampshire from Georgian times until its demolition to make way for houses in 1968.

History
The earliest deed still in existence (for the field "Nine Acres") is dated 1660.
The House itself was a three storey, rectangular mansion with shuttered windows and formal gardens. These eventually became Keydell Nurseries, although the business which still trades under that name moved to a bigger site in 1987. The House had two notable owners: the Victorian actor Edmund Kean; and, most famously, Sir Drury Curzon Drury-Lowe, a full general of the British Army.

Notes

External links

Horndean